Julio Walter Montero Castillo (born 25 April 1944, in Montevideo) is a Uruguayan former international footballer who played as a defender.

He started his career with Liverpool FC (Montevideo), before joining Nacional in 1966. He later played for Independiente of Argentina, and Spanish side Granada. He made 64 La Liga appearances for Granada between 1973 and 1975, scoring two goals.

He made a total of 68 Copa Libertadores appearances between 1966 and 1973.

He represented the Uruguay national football team in the 1970 FIFA World Cup (playing in all six matches) and the 1974 FIFA World Cup.

Montero Castillo is the father of the international footballer Paolo Montero.

References

External links

1944 births
Living people
Footballers from Montevideo
Uruguayan footballers
Uruguay international footballers
Uruguayan expatriate footballers
Expatriate footballers in Spain
Uruguayan expatriate sportspeople in Spain
1970 FIFA World Cup players
1974 FIFA World Cup players
Uruguayan Primera División players
La Liga players
Liverpool F.C. (Montevideo) players
Club Nacional de Football players
Granada CF footballers
Uruguayan people of Spanish descent
Place of birth missing (living people)
1967 South American Championship players
Association football defenders